Let's Call It Swing is an album by American jazz drummer Louis Bellson featuring performances recorded in 1956 and 1957 for the Verve label.

Reception
Allmusic awarded the album 3 stars.

Track listing
 "Seedless Grape Fruit"
 "Flying Hickory"
 "That's Bell's Son"
 "Park Avenue Patter"
 "Smiling King"
 "Strip Out Sam"
 "Drum Solo"
 "Jack's Up"
 "Go Ahead"
 "Swing This"
 "Let's Call It Swing"
Recorded in New York City on May 30, 1956 (tracks 1-6) and in Los Angeles, CA on January 23, 1957 (track 7) and January 25, 1957 (tracks 8-11)

Personnel
Louis Bellson – drums
Doc Severinsen (tracks 8-11), Charlie Shavers (tracks 1-6) - trumpet 
Vincent Forchetti (tracks 1-6), Sonny Russo (tracks 8-11) - trombone
Red Press - alto saxophone (tracks 1-6 & 8-11)
Eddie Wasserman - tenor saxophone (tracks 1-6 & 8-11)
Ted Lee (tracks 1-6), Ernie Wilkins (tracks 8-11) - baritone saxophone
Irving Josephs (tracks 8-11), Lou Stein (tracks 1-6) - piano 
George Duvivier – bass
Louis Bellson, Don Redman, Ernie Wilkins - arranger

References

Verve Records albums
Louie Bellson albums
1958 albums
Albums produced by Norman Granz